Jetix (stylized as JETIX) was a children's entertainment brand owned by The Walt Disney Company. The brand was for a slate of action/adventure-related programming blocks and television channels. Jetix programming mainly originated from the Saban Entertainment library, airing live-action and animated series with some original programming.

Jetix was first launched as a programming block in the United States on Toon Disney on February 14, 2004, to compete with Cartoon Network's Toonami block, and in Europe in April 2004. By the end of 2004, Jetix began completely replacing the international Fox Kids channels around the world, the first being the French version in August 2004, and the last one being the German version, in June 2005.

Although it was commercially successful, the Jetix brand was later discontinued in 2009. All international channels were rebranded as either Disney XD or Disney Channel due to The Walt Disney Company's focus on its "Disney," "ABC," and "ESPN" brands. After the shutdown of the last Jetix channel in Russia (replaced with Disney Channel Russia) on August 10, 2010, and with the shutdown of Jetix Play in the Middle East on September 1, 2010 (which was replaced with Playhouse Disney, later Disney Junior) the Jetix brand officially ceased usage.

History

The development of the Jetix brand and launch in the United States 
In January 2004, Fox Kids Europe, Fox Kids Latin America (both of which were purchased by Disney in 2001 as part of Fox Family Worldwide) and the ABC Cable Networks Group agreed to rename its then current operations under a single brand, called Jetix, which helped strengthen its then operations into a single force. The Jetix name was applied to its programming blocks which aired on ABC Family and Toon Disney, its television channels in Europe and Latin America, along with its program library and merchandising. After the end of Fox Kids in the US, much of the content previously aired on the block migrated to ABC Family and Toon Disney; the international Fox Kids networks kept operating despite their US forerunner becoming defunct.

The Jetix name was chosen after the company conducted international research specifically with a number of children's focus groups. Many of the children picked the name as it implied action and adventure, and the company was able to use the name internationally due to its ambiguity. Bruce Steinberg, chairman and chief executive officer of Fox Kids Europe, explain that Jetix would help strengthen Fox Kids Europe's partnership with Disney while building new alliances to continue to successfully leverage its programming library and distribution.

On Valentine's Day 2004, Toon Disney and ABC Family launched Jetix with Jetix Cards Live, the world's first concurrently online and telecast trading card game. ABC Family aired Jetix on weekdays from 7am to 9am and weekends 7am to 12 noon ET/PT. The block also aired on Toon Disney Monday through Thursday from 7pm to 9pm ET/PT and weekends from 7pm to 9pm ET/PT.

International expansion and transition of the Fox Kids brand into Jetix 
Outside of the United States, Jetix was firstly launched as a programming block on the European Fox Kids channels in April 2004, airing in mornings and afternoons.

The transition to the Jetix brand started in August 2004, with replacing the French version of Fox Kids, and at the same month, it was also launched in Latin America. In October 2004, it was launched in Scandinavia, in January 2005 in most European countries, in February in the Netherlands and in March in Italy and Israel. The very last Fox Kids channel to be replaced by Jetix was the German version, which was closed in June 2005, ending the transition from Fox Kids to Jetix.

In addition, the Fox Kids Play channels available in CEE and MENA (which primarily aired programming from the Saban/Fox Kids/Jetix archives, including some DiC Entertainment shows) were also rebranded as Jetix Play, on 1 January 2005.

The new Jetix brand brought together the children's programming department at ABC's domestic cable networks, as well as Fox Kids in Europe and Latin America, in a joint programming alliance. The first Jetix Europe co-productions were W.I.T.C.H. and Super Robot Monkey Team Hyper Force Go!, with Get Ed and Yin Yang Yo! following in 2005 and 2006 respectively.

The fate of Jetix 
In Autumn 2006, Toon Disney in the United States became the exclusive home for Jetix, effectively ending the block on ABC Family. However, the Jetix programming block continued to take significant chunks of Toon Disney's airtime, until the introduction of Disney XD in the United States on February 13, 2009.

Disney XD was to be slightly different from Jetix; it still mostly focused on the boy demographic, but would have more live-action productions under the Disney banner and also be a home for Disney's recent animated productions (for both boys and girls), effectively superseding Toon Disney in the United States. In the U.S., the new brand was to be "aimed at boys ages 6-14 and features content focusing on the themes of adventure, accomplishment, gaming, music and sports."

A few months before the U.S. launch of Disney XD on December 8, 2008, Disney announced that it would be increasing its shares in Jetix Europe to 96% with the intention to buy the remaining shares in the company, effectively ending Jetix Europe's autonomy. Disney wanted full control of the company and to bring the European Jetix channels completely under the Disney umbrella, especially as this would enable Disney to have a singular unified strategy for its channels. After the completion of Jetix Europe's share buy-back offer, Jetix Europe was delisted from the Euronext Amsterdam stock exchange on 27 February 2009. In the gradual phase out of the Jetix brand, Jetix Europe's CEO Paul Taylor resigned, with John Hardie, the Executive Vice President of Disney Channels EMEA as CEO on 11 February 2009. John Hardie left Disney for ITN in June 2009 and was replaced with Giorgio Stock (who later became head of Turner Broadcasting System Europe).

In June 2008, Disney France announced that Disney Channel and Jetix would merge operations; at the time, Jetix was being affected by falling carriage rates and came close to leaving the CanalSat pay-TV platform in France after protracted negotiations. Jetix France was the first European version of Jetix to make the conversion to Disney XD on 1 April 2009.

In countries where Disney Channel didn't already exist, Jetix became Disney Channel (most notably the Central Eastern Europe and the Hungary, Czech Republic and Slovakia feeds). The last main Jetix feed in operation, Jetix Russia, made the conversion to Disney Channel on 10 August 2010. Also, in the countries where Jetix Play broadcast, it became a localised version of Playhouse Disney; however, the rollout was not synchronized with the conversion of the main Jetix networks in these areas, instead happening between 2010 and 2011, one region at a time.

In Italy, the managing director of Jetix Italy, Francesco Nespega, led a management buyout; Jetix Italy was renamed as Switchover Media and was now responsible for two channels that were previously operated by Jetix Italy, pay-TV channel GXT and free-to-air channel K2. However, the main Jetix Italy channel remained at Disney and was rebranded as Disney XD in September 2009.

List of versions

Other versions

Programming

Jetix was primarily built upon Disney's ownership of the Saban Entertainment library (acquired along with ABC Family Worldwide in 2001), which included shows from Marvel Productions; action-adventure shows were the primary programming theme, though not all Jetix networks and blocks were necessarily limited to that genre. Furthermore, programming from outside producers and distributors were also included.

Jetix Animation Concepts was a brand used for animation co-produced by and for the Jetix global group by the ABC Cable Networks Group.

Magazine and other ventures
As part of brand extension, many of the overseas Jetix networks engaged in various marketing exercises, including print publications, awards shows and sporting events.

In the U.K., Future plc published the official Jetix Magazine; it was launched in early September 2004 by Jetix Consumer Products and Future Publishing. Cavan Scott was the magazine's initial editor. Published every four weeks, it featured puzzles and features based on the channel's shows.  The magazine also came with a free DVD featuring shows from the channel.

In other countries, including Bulgaria, the Netherlands and Romania, similar Jetix magazines were also produced.

With the purchase of the remaining Jetix Europe shares by The Walt Disney Company and the change over of the channels to a Disney branded channel, Future renamed the magazine to Nitro!, to become an independent magazine with the same general focus.

In CEE, there was annual children's musical event called Jetix Kids Awards, in which children could vote their favorite shows and stars, in order to win prizes. The last edition took place in 2008.

The Jetix Kids Cup (formerly known as the Fox Kids Cup) was an association football tournament in which children from 16 countries competed to "promote fair play, sportsmanship and cultural exchange".

See also
 List of Disney TV programming blocks
 List of programs broadcast by Disney XD
 List of programs broadcast by Toon Disney
 List of programs broadcast by Fox Kids

References

External links
 jetix.net at archive.org, 20 July 2004
 jetixkidscup.com at archive.org, 16 May 2006
 Jetix Europe at archive.org, 14 March 2018
 Jetix Magazine UK content

Disney television networks
Disney XD
Television programming blocks
Television channels and stations established in 2004
Television channels and stations disestablished in 2009
Television channels and stations disestablished in 2010
Children's television networks
Defunct television channels in the Netherlands